The Principality of Hà Tiên (Mueang Phutthai Mat), or the Hà Tiên Protectorate, was a principality ruled by Chinese refugees of the Mạc (Mo) clan at the Mekong Delta, in modern-day southern Vietnam. It was originally de facto independent, but later became a vassal state of the Siamese Rattanakosin Kingdom and the Vietnamese Nguyễn dynasty in the 18th and 19th century prior to its annexation by the latter in 1832. Along with Phố Hiến, Hoi An, and Saigon, Hà Tiên was a major Chinese community center and important hub of Ming loyalist networks in premodern Indochina.

The name of the principality was variously spelled as Hexian Zhen (河仙鎮), Nangang (南港), Gangkou (港口), Bendi (本底) or Kundama (昆大嗎) in Chinese, Phutthaimat or Banthaimat in Thai, Ponthiamas, Pontheaymas and Pontiano in French, Panthai-mas, Bantaimas, Pontiamas, Pontaimas, Bantay-mas, Banteay M'eas, Pontiamas, Pontiamasse, Po-taimat, Can Cao, Cancar, and infinite other variations. Many of the pronunciations were similar to Banteay Meas, thus confusing Hà Tiên with a nearby town Banteay Meas.

History
Hà Tiên and its nearby area had been a part of Cambodia for a long time. In the late 17th century, a Chinese refugee, Mok Kiu (the Vietnamese called him Mạc Cửu), who had fled his homeland in Leizhou peninsula back then in 1671, was granted the Khmer title Oknha ("marquess") by Cambodian king. He was allowed to build a small town composed of Chinese émigrée in the mouth of Mekong Delta. The colonial town was known as Hà Tiên in Vietnamese sources, while Cambodian called it Peam. The area had a dual political structure: Mạc Cửu ruled Chinese and Vietnamese; while local Khmers continued to be ruled by a Khmer governor, called Oknha Reacheasetthi. However, Siamese sources called the Hà Tiên rulers Phraya Rachasethi, thus confusing them with the Khmer governor.

Mạc Cửu switched allegiance to the Nguyễn lords of Vietnam in 1707, just after an invasion by Siam. He received the Vietnamese rank hầu ("marquess") from the Nguyễn. Since then, the Southern Vietnamese dominion saw Hà Tiên as an independent polity but a vassal of them. However, as a vassal of Cambodia, Hà Tiên still paid taxes to Cambodian court. 

Mạc Cửu died in 1736, his son Mạc Thiên Tứ (Mo Shilin) succeeded. A Cambodian army invaded Hà Tiên in 1739 but was utterly defeated. From then on, Cambodia did not try to resume Hà Tiên, Hà Tiên enjoyed full independence from Cambodia thereafter.

Mạc Thiên Tứ's reign saw the golden age of Hà Tiên. In 1758, Hà Tiên established Outey II as puppet king of Cambodia. After War of the second fall of Ayutthaya, Mạc Thiên Tứ tried to install Prince Chao Chui (Chiêu Thúy in Vietnamese) as the new Siamese king, but was defeated by Taksin. Hà Tiên was completely devastated by Siamese troops in 1771, Mạc Thiên Tứ had flee to Trấn Giang (modern Cần Thơ). In there, he was sheltered by Nguyễn lord. Two years later, Siamese army withdrew from Hà Tiên, and Mạc Thiên Tứ retook his principality.

After Tây Sơn rebellion broke out, Hà Tiên supported the Nguyễn. The Nguyễn regime was overthrown in 1777, Mạc Thiên Tứ refused to surrender to Tây Sơn rebels, and fled to Siam. He was thrown into prison by Taksin in 1780, his two sons and most of his wife's Vietnamese Kinh family members were executed. His other children were rescued and hid in the Siam countryside where they later assimilated into Hainan Min speaking community. In this situation, a power vacuum developed. After Rama I was crowned the new Siamese king in 1782, a Siamese general Phraya Thatsada (Thát Xỉ Đa in Vietnamese) was sent to capture Hà Tiên. The town was occupied by rebels but soon was captured by Nguyễn Ánh. However, Ánh had to abandon it because he was attacked by Tây Sơn army. In 1785, a Siamese army under Krom Luang Thepharirak was sent to help Nguyễn Ánh. In the same time, Mạc Tử Sinh was sent back to Hà Tiên by Rama I. When the Siamese fleet landed in Banteay Meas, an army under Mạc Tử Sinh and Phraya Thatsada was to reinforce them. However, Siamese fleet was defeated by Tây Sơn army in Battle of Rạch Gầm-Xoài Mút. Mạc Tử Sinh and Nguyễn Ánh fled to Siam.

Nguyễn Ánh returned to Vietnam and retook Gia Định (present-day Ho Chi Minh City) in 1787. In the same time, Mạc Tử Sinh was sent back to help Nguyễn Ánh. Chinese researcher Dai Kelai (戴可来) stated that Mạc Tử Sinh was probably a puppet ruler installed by Siam. Not long after Mạc Tử Sinh died, Ngô Ma (吳魔) briefly served as acting ruler. Ngô Ma was probably the same person Thông ngôn A Ma (通言阿摩, lit. "A Ma, the interpreter"), a Siamese who served as a Vietnamese interpreter during Taksin's reign.

Maha Sura Singhanat appointed Mạc Công Bính as the new ruler of Hà Tiên in 1789. However, when Mạc Công Bính arrived in Vietnam, Nguyễn Ánh appointed him the governor of Long Xuyên. It made Singhanat very angry, Nguyễn Ánh had to send him back to Hà Tiên. Mạc Công Bính died in 1792; two generals, Trần Hanh (陳亨) and Trần Tô (陳蘇) were appointed acting rulers by Siam. 

In 1800, Mạc Tử Thiêm was appointed the new ruler by Siam, and sent back to Hà Tiên. Since 1803, Hà Tiên was subjected to the jurisdiction of the Viceroyalty of Gia Định (Gia Định Thành). Mạc Tử Thiêm went to Bangkok to attend Anurak Devesh's funeral in 1807. During his absence, Mạc Công Du was appointed the acting ruler by Nguyễn Ánh. 

Mạc Tử Thiêm died in 1809. Since then, Vietnamese Nguyễn dynasty managed to appoint the ruler of Hà Tiên directly. Feared of provoking Siamese, Ngô Y Nghiễm (吳依儼) and Lê Tiến Giảng (黎進講) were appointed quyền lĩnh trấn sự (權領鎮事, "acting governor") instead of trấn thủ (鎮守, "governor"). The Vietnamese managed to eliminate the influence of Mạc family in this area. 

In 1818, Mạc Công Du was appointed the ruler of Hà Tiên, however, he was only an official under Nguyễn dynasty. Mạc Công Du retired in 1829, his younger brother Mạc Công Tài succeeded. Hà Tiên trấn was disestablished in 1832. Hà Tiên Province was formed in its area.

Lê Văn Khôi revolt broke out in 1833, Mạc Công Du, Mạc Công Tài, their sons Mạc Hầu Hy (鄚侯熺) and Mạc Hầu Diệu (鄚侯耀), accepted official posts from rebels. All of them were arrested and taken to Huế. In the same year, Mạc Công Du and Mạc Công Tài died in prison. Later, Mạc Hầu Hy fled to Siam.

List of Hà Tiên rulers

Notes

References 

 
 

 

 
States and territories established in 1707
States and territories disestablished in 1832
1707 establishments in Asia
1832 disestablishments in Asia
18th century in Cambodia
19th century in Cambodia
18th century in Vietnam
19th century in Vietnam
18th century in Siam
19th century in Siam
Ha Tien
Ha Tien
Ha Tien
Ha Tien
Former protectorates
Kiên Giang province
Kampot province
Chinese diaspora in Southeast Asia
Cambodia–Vietnam relations
Thailand–Vietnam relations